Laurier-Station is a village municipality in Lotbinière Regional County Municipality in the Chaudière-Appalaches region of Quebec, Canada. Its population is 2,634 as of the Canada 2011 Census.

It is named after its train station, Laurier, itself named in honour of prime minister Wilfrid Laurier. It is also the town where the professional hockey player David Desharnais was born.

Demographics 

Notable people
 Laurent Beaudoin – businessman
 David Desharnais - ice hockey player

References 

Commission de toponymie du Québec
Ministère des Affaires municipales, des Régions et de l'Occupation du territoire

Villages in Quebec
Incorporated places in Chaudière-Appalaches
Lotbinière Regional County Municipality